Wilde Oscar (born 8 April 1967 in Burnham, Buckinghamshire, England) is an English retired pornographic film actor. He is noted for being married to, and frequently performing with, the English pornographic film actress, Nici Sterling.

Quotes 

As quoted in The Independent newspaper in June 2000.
Although I have done films with Nici and in my own right, Nici's the star in the family. She's the one the directors are keen on. For a long while the fact that we were a married couple was a great selling point. There aren't many in this industry and those who work together on screen are rarer still.

Awards
1998 AVN Award – Best Supporting Actor (Film) – Doin' the Ritz
2001 AVN Award – Best Supporting Actor (Video) – West Side

See also
 List of British pornographic actors

References

External links 
 

1967 births
Living people
English male pornographic film actors